The 2000 Copa del Rey was the 64th edition of the Spanish basketball Cup. It was organized by the ACB and was played in Vitoria-Gasteiz in the Araba Arena between January 28 and 31, 2000. Estudiantes won its third title.

Bracket

Final

MVP of the Tournament: Alfonso Reyes

References

External links
Boxscores at ACB.com 
Linguasport

Copa del Rey de Baloncesto
1999–2000 in Spanish basketball